Brian Finnegan (born 20 August 1969) is an Irish flute and tin whistle player from Armagh.

Finnegan began playing whistle at age 8 and flute at age 10 as a student of the Armagh Pipers Club under the tuition of the Vallely family. He first came to public attention with the Irish group Upstairs in a Tent.

In 1993 he made a solo album When the Party's Over, which was recorded at Redesdale Studios. In 1995 he formed Flook.Originally a three piece who toured as 'Three Nations Flutes' with Sarah Allen and Mike McGoldrick, they later added Ed Boyd on guitar forming Flook. When Mike left the band in 1997, John Joe Kelly (a frequent guest musician) was added as a band member on bodhrán. Flook continue to tour all over the world with fans across the globe. In 2006, Flook was awarded best band in the BBC Radio 2 Folk Awards. In 2019, the band returned from an extended hiatus with the release of their fourth studio album "Ancora". Brian is a frequent tutor for Folkworks and Burwell Bash where he has been a tutor since 1994.

He tours regularly across the US, Latin America and Ireland with guitarist William Coulter with whom he released the EP 'Toward the Sun' in 2015. He also plays with an influential Russian rock group Aquarium, both live and on their studio albums (since approximately 2009). He worked on cross genre project Parallelogram.

, Brian plays with his own trio, with guitarist Ian Stephenson and drummer Jim Goodwin. They formed a four-piece, KAN, with those musicians and fiddler Aidan O'Rourke until disbanding in 2014. A solo album, The Ravishing Genius of Bones, was released in 2010.

Discography

Solo/Duo/Trio 

 When The Party's Over (1993)
 The Ravishing Genius of Bones (2010)
 Toward The Sun (with William Coulter) (2014)
 Flow, In The Year of Wu Wei - Single (2020)
 Hunger of the Skin (2021)

As Band Member Of

Flook 

 Flook! Live! - Small CD 9405 (1996)
 The Four of Us - Flatfish Records 001CD (1999)
 Flatfish - Flatfish Records 002CD (1999)
 Rubai - Flatfish Records 004CD (2002)
 Haven - Flatfish Records 005CD (2005)
 Ancora - Flatfish Records 006CD (2019)

Maalstroom 

 Face in the Water (2000)

Aquarium (Åквариум) 

 Лошадь Белая (2008)
 Пушкинская 10 (2009)
 День Радости (2010)
 Архангельск (2011)
 Полная Дискография (2013)
 Двери Травы (2017)

KAN 

 Sleeper (2012)

As Guest Artist/Other 

 Evolving Traditions, Vol. 2 - Various (1996)
 Down And Out In Belfast And Budapest - Patrick McMullan (1997)
 Excalibur (La Légende Des Celtes) - Alan Simon (1998)
 Sweet Liberty - Cara Dillon (2003)
 Goodnight Ginger - John McCusker (2003)
 A Different Life - Emily Smith (2005)
 Sirius - Aidan O'Rourke (2006)
 Excalibur II (L'anneau Des Celtes) - Alan Simon (2007)
 The Irish Drum: An Bodhran - Peter Houlahan (2007)
 Hill of Thieves - Cara Dillon (2008)
 Yella Hoose + Goodnight Ginger - John McCusker (2008)
 Fame and Glory - Fairport Convention (2008)
 Worth It All - Su (2008)
 Line Up - Ian Stephenson (2010)
 How To Tune A Fish - Beoga (2011)
 Riga Live 01.12.2009 - Boris Grebenshikov (2011)
 Å+ - Å+  (2013)
 Соль - БГ (2014)
 Symphonia БГ - Å+ (2017)
 ÷ (Divide) - Ed Sheeran (2017)
 KeltiK - Xabi Aburruzaga (2017)
 Время N - БГ (2018)
 Знак Огня - БГ (2020)

References

External links

 
KAN 
Burwell Bash

1969 births
Tin whistle players from Northern Ireland
Flautists from Northern Ireland
People from Armagh (city)
Living people
Flook (band) members
Musicians from County Armagh